Allow Me, Daddy! is a 1956 Italian comedy film directed by Mario Bonnard.

Plot 
Rodolfo, a young man with the ambitions of an opera singer in the bass register, does not work, gets up at midday and lives on the shoulders of his butchers in-laws, who keep his singing studies with a profiteer teacher. Finally, he is cornered by his father-in-law, who expects him to work, as a singer or with any other occupation. The teacher, for fear of losing the profit, arranges for Rodolfo to be hired for just one evening in the small part of Doctor Grenvil in La traviata.

Rodolfo, after having created problems in the rehearsals, executes, in general disapproval, the phrase "Consumption does not grant her but a few hours" lowering it by an octave, reaching low C, and furthermore, advancing to the proscenium while the curtain falls. He closes behind him, sings the phrase: «It's off!», not foreseen since, although present in the score, it is traditionally omitted. Everything happens: the other performers, the conductor and the theater director are indignant, while family and friends believe that he has been a great success. He will continue to study singing with the usual teacher, resuming life as always.

Cast 
Aldo Fabrizi: Alessandro Biagi 
Alberto Sordi: Rodolfo Nardi 
: Sora Mimma 
Marisa de Leza: Marina Biagi 
Sergio Raimondi: Tullio Biagi 
Franco Silva: Gigi Biagi 
: Elisa 
Turi Pandolfini: Granpa Giuseppe 
Achille Majeroni:  Edmondo D'Aragona
: Rosa 
Riccardo Billi: Romoletto 
Paola Borboni: Madame Sonia Varonowska   
Elly Parvo: Fasòli
Renato Navarrini: Manfredi
: Director of the theatre
Nerio Bernardi: Enzo Bernard 
Mino Doro: Santini  
Zoe Incrocci: Client
Giulio Neri: Himself
Rosanna Carteri: Herself
Afro Poli: Himself

References

External links

1956 films
1956 comedy films
Italian comedy films
Films directed by Mario Bonnard
Films set in Rome
Films shot in Rome
Films with screenplays by Ruggero Maccari
Films with screenplays by Giovanni Grimaldi
1950s Italian-language films
1950s Italian films
Italian black-and-white films